Global Technology Associates, Inc. (GTA) is a developer and pioneer of Internet firewalls. The company is privately held with its headquarters, development and support facilities based in Orlando, Florida.

History
GTA was founded by a group of software engineers in 1992, and in 1994 was one of the first companies to introduced a commercial firewall.  The original firewall they introduced was the GFX-94. The GFX-94 was a stateful firewall with unique dual walled design that consisted of two separate hardware devices comprising the inner and outer firewall. The GFX-94 was in the first group of firewalls certified by the NCSA (now ICSA).  In 1996 GTA introduced the first tiny footprint firewall, the GNAT Box firewall, which fit entirely on a 3.5" floppy diskette.  The GNAT Box firewall evolved into the current GB-OS.  GB-OS is the operating system for all GTA firewalls and carries the ICSA Firewall Certification.

In April 2018, the company announced on its Facebook page that it was ending all new business.

External links
 GTA Web Site
 GTA Forum

References

ItDefense Magazine March 2006
"Stop 'em with a box",  Network World Aug 8, 2000 David Strom
"Tiny Firewalls Fill a Niche." Network World, November 30, 1998 Christopher Null

Companies based in Orlando, Florida
Software companies established in 1992
Networking companies of the United States
Networking hardware companies
1992 establishments in Florida
Software companies disestablished in 2018
2018 disestablishments in Florida